Henry Drum (November 21, 1857 – March 19, 1950) was an American politician in the state of Washington. He served in the Washington State Senate from 1889 to 1893 (1889–91 for District 18, 1891–93 for District 21).

Biography
Henry Drum was born in Girard, Illinois on November 21, 1857.

He married Jessie M. Thompson in 1884, and they had five children.

He worked as a teacher in Nebraska before becoming a banker in Tacoma, Washington. He also worked in insurance, and held interests in oyster beds.

He died in Tacoma on March 19, 1950.

References

Democratic Party Washington (state) state senators
1857 births
1950 deaths
People from Girard, Illinois